William Ayscough or Aiscough (c. 1395 – 29 June 1450) was a medieval English cleric who served as Bishop of Salisbury from 1438 until his death.

Ayscough was nominated on 11 February 1438 and consecrated on 20 July 1438. He was a royal confessor and a regular member of the royal council.

Ayscough was murdered at Edington, Wiltshire, on 29 June 1450 by an angry mob during Jack Cade's Rebellion. He was present at the marriage of Henry VI and his wife, Margaret of Anjou, who were very unpopular at the time.

Citations

References
 

Bishops of Salisbury
15th-century English Roman Catholic bishops
1450 deaths
Year of birth unknown
Year of birth uncertain